Clifford is a small village in West Yorkshire, England. The population at the 2011 Census was 1,662. Many of the older buildings are built of magnesian limestone.

Etymology
The name Clifford is first attested in the Domesday Book of 1086. It comes from the Old English words clif ('cliff, bank') and ford ('ford'), thus meaning 'ford at the bank or cliff'. This perhaps referred to the crossing of the River Wharfe at Boston Spa, which was then within the manor.

History
According to the Domesday Book, in 1086, Ligulf held the manor, which comprised six carucates with four ploughs.

In the Middle Ages Clifford was a subordinate settlement to Bramham, and had no parish church or manor house.  A Wesleyan chapel was built some time before 1838, and the three churches soon after. The Anglican St Luke's Church was built in 1840.

Clifford was originally a farming community, but in 1831, corn mills powered by Bramham Beck on Old Mill Lane, were transformed into flax mills, making patent yarn and shoe thread. The mills were owned by the Grimston Brothers. At its height, the business employed about 300 workers, some of them Irish immigrants, and many of whom lived in the stone terraced cottages in the village.

Governance
Clifford was a township in the old parish of Bramham, in the upper-division of the wapentake of Barkston Ash, in the West Riding of Yorkshire.  It became a separate civil parish in 1866 as Clifton with Boston, which was split into the civil parishes of Clifford and Boston Spa in 1896.

Geography
Clifford is a rural village, with a conservation area at its centre. It has a mix of buildings from traditional magnesian limestone cottages to modern family housing. All construction within the conservation area must use local limestone. Green Belt land separates the village from Bramham and Boston Spa. Limestone for building was quarried locally.

Bus services coordinated by West Yorkshire Passenger Transport Executive go to Tadcaster,  Leeds, Harrogate, Wetherby and Wakefield.

Religion

There are three churches in Clifford. The Anglican church dedicated to St Luke on high ground at the western end of the village is built in the Gothic style of architecture and was consecrated by the Archbishop of York in 1842. The church cost £1200 raised by subscription and the site was donated by George Lane-Fox. The Wesleyan Methodists built a chapel, and the Roman Catholics built St Edward King and Confessor Catholic Church to serve the population of Irish workers that came to work in Grimstons flax mill established in the village in 1831. The Grimston, Clifford and Vavasour families contributed to the cost of building the church.

Economy

Clifford has two public houses The Albion and The Old Star) and a fish and chip shop (Clifford Fisheries).  There were no other shops or businesses in 2009 as the post office had been converted into houses.

Public houses
The Old Star is a historic multi room pub owned and operated by Samuel Smith's Old Brewery. The Albion is situated on the edge of the village is run under lease from Enterprise Inns.

Education
There are three schools in the Clifford parish, Bramham Primary School, St. John's School for the Deaf and Boston Spa School.

Culture
The Village Hall is a small venue for concerts and plays. Clifford's first Beer Festival took place in June 2010. Clifford's second Champion Beer Festival took place on 2 July 2011 and due to its popularity took place for a third and fourth time (2012, 2013) and has become an annual event.

Clifford has a monthly magazine, The Outlook, that is delivered free to every resident by the committee.

References

Bibliography

External links

 Clifford Methodist Church
 Clifford Parish Council 

Places in Leeds
Civil parishes in West Yorkshire